The Queen Consort Act 1540 (32 Hen 8 c 51) was an Act of the Parliament of England.

The whole Act, so far as unrepealed, was repealed by section 1 of, and Part III of the Schedule to, the Statute Law (Repeals) Act 1969.

References
Halsbury's Statutes,

Acts of the Parliament of England (1485–1603)
1540 in law
1540 in England